Farukh Sadullayevich Ruzimatov (born 26 June 1963) is an Uzbek-Russian ballet dancer. Since 2018, Ruzimatov has been artistic director of the ballet company at Navoi Theatre in Tashkent, Uzbekistan. In a dancing career spanning more than three decades, Ruzimatov was mostly associated with the Mariinsky Theatre, where he was the principal dancer and assistant artistic director of the company.

Biography
Ruzimatov was born in Tashkent, Uzbek SSR, Soviet Union (now Uzbekistan).

Ruzimatov enrolled in the Vaganova Academy in 1973 in Leningrad, where he trained under Gennady Selyutsky. Upon his 1981 graduation, Ruzimatov began dancing with the Kirov Ballet and became a principal dancer in 1986.

His repertoire includes such roles as Albrecht in Giselle, Solor in La Bayadère, Golden Slave in Shéhérazade, Ali in Le Corsaire, Prince Desire in The Sleeping Beauty, The Prince in The Nutcracker, Siegfried in Swan Lake, Basil in Don Quixote, and many others. He has also performed as principal guest artist with the American Ballet Theatre.

From 2007 to 2009, he was artistic director of the ballet at the Mikhailovsky Theatre. Since 2018, Ruzimatov is artistic director of the ballet company at Navoi Theatre in Tashkent, Uzbekistan.

Partnerships 
Ruzimatov has had many successful partnerships, but the two most well known are probably his collaboration with Yulia Makhalina in Kirov productions of Giselle and La Bayadere, and he partnered Larissa Lezhnina in her Kirov debut as Aurora in the 1989 production of The Sleeping Beauty. He went on to partner her in Diana and Acteon, but as she left the Kirov to become a soloist for the Dutch National Ballet in 1994, their promising collaboration was cut short. But the strongest partnership was with Altynai Asylmuratova. The couple were most seen dancing together in the ballet Le Corsaire, but when Asylmuratova retired, Ruzimatov was later dancing with Diana Vishneva in the early 2000s.

Awards 
 Honoured Artist of Russia (1995)
 People's Artist of Russia (2000)
 Honoured Artist of Tajikistan (1988)
 Silver Medallist of the Sixth Varna International Competition (1983)
 Special diploma by the Paris Academy of Dance
 Prix Benois de la Danse (1997)
 Prizewinner of Baltika prize (1998)

References

External links
 (Russian and English)
 (Russian and English)

Mariinsky Ballet principal dancers
Dancers from Tashkent
1963 births
Living people
Russian male ballet dancers
Prix Benois de la Danse winners
20th-century Russian ballet dancers